In functional analysis, a discipline within mathematics, a locally convex topological vector space (TVS) is said to be infrabarrelled (also spelled infrabarreled) if every bounded absorbing barrel is a neighborhood of the origin.

Characterizations

If  is a Hausdorff locally convex space then the canonical injection from  into its bidual is a topological embedding if and only if  is infrabarrelled.

Properties

Every quasi-complete infrabarrelled space is barrelled.

Examples

Every barrelled space is infrabarrelled.  
A closed vector subspace of an infrabarrelled space is, however, not necessarily infrabarrelled. 

Every product and locally convex direct sum of any family of infrabarrelled spaces is infrabarrelled.  
Every separated quotient of an infrabarrelled space is infrabarrelled.

See also

References

Bibliography

  
  
  
  
  
  
  

Functional analysis
Topological vector spaces